XEGMSR-AM is a radio station on 620 AM in Villahermosa, Tabasco. It is owned by Grupo Multimedios Sin Reservas and carries a talk format.

History
XEGMSR was awarded in the IFT-4 radio auction of 2017 and came to air on March 5, 2018. The frequency had previously been occupied by XEHGR-AM, which migrated to FM as XHHGR-FM 94.1.

It was owned by Juan Carlos Huerta Gutiérrez, who had previously spent two decades hosting the local Panorama Informativo newscast on Grupo ACIR stations. However, within three months of signing on XEGMSR, on May 15, 2018, Huerta was killed outside of his home, making him the fourth journalist to die in Mexico in 2018.

References

Radio stations in Tabasco
Radio stations established in 2018
2018 establishments in Mexico